The 1957–58 Czechoslovak Extraliga season was the 15th season of the Czechoslovak Extraliga, the top level of ice hockey in Czechoslovakia. 12 teams participated in the league, and Ruda Hvezda Brno won the championship.

Standings

External links
History of Czechoslovak ice hockey

Czech
Czechoslovak Extraliga seasons
1957 in Czechoslovak sport
1958 in Czechoslovak sport